Pavel Bednář (born June 25, 1970) is a Czech sprint canoer and marathon canoeist who competed in the 1990s. He won two medals at the ICF Canoe Sprint World Championships with a silver (C-1 10000 m: 1993) and a bronze (C-2 200 m: 1997).

Bednář also competed at the 1996 Summer Olympics in Atlanta, but was eliminated in the semifinals of both the C-2 500 m and the C-2 1000 m events.

References

Sports-Reference.com profile

1970 births
Canoeists at the 1996 Summer Olympics
Czech male canoeists
Living people
Olympic canoeists of the Czech Republic
ICF Canoe Sprint World Championships medalists in Canadian